Sarah Jane Murray is an Irish-born academic who works in the United States. 

Born in Ireland, she graduated from Auburn University with a BA in French and Philosophy, and studied at the École normale supérieure de lettres et sciences humaines in Lyon before getting her MA and PhD from Princeton University. She is the author of From Plato to Lancelot: A Preface to Chrétien de Troyes (Syracuse UP, 2008). She teaches medieval literature and film making at Baylor University as an "Associate Professor of Great Texts and Creative Writing".

References

External links
Sarah Jane Murray at the Baylor Institute for Studies of Religion

Year of birth missing (living people)
Living people
Irish scholars and academics
Baylor University faculty
Princeton University alumni
Auburn University alumni